VIX is the ticker symbol and the popular name for the Chicago Board Options Exchange's CBOE Volatility Index, a popular measure of the stock market's expectation of volatility based on S&P 500 index options. It is calculated and disseminated on a real-time basis by the CBOE, and is often referred to as the fear index or fear gauge.

The VIX traces its origin to the financial economics research of Menachem Brenner and Dan Galai.  In a series of papers beginning in 1989, Brenner and Galai proposed the creation of a series of volatility indices, beginning with an index on stock market volatility, and moving to interest rate and foreign exchange rate volatility.

In their papers, Brenner and Galai proposed, "[the] volatility index, to be named 'Sigma Index', would be updated frequently and used as the underlying asset for futures and options. ... A volatility index would play the same role as the market index plays for options and futures on the index." In 1992, the CBOE hired consultant Bob Whaley to calculate values for stock market volatility based on this theoretical work. Whaley utilized data series in the index options market, and provided the CBOE with computations for daily VIX levels from January 1986 to May 1992.

The resulting VIX index formulation provides a measure of market volatility on which expectations of further stock market volatility in the near future might be based. The current VIX index value quotes the expected annualized change in the S&P 500 index over the following 30 days, as computed from options-based theory and current options-market data. 

To summarize, VIX is a volatility index derived from S&P 500 options for the 30 days following the measurement date, with the price of each option representing the market's expectation of 30-day forward-looking volatility. The resulting VIX index formulation provides a measure of expected market volatility on which expectations of further stock market volatility in the near future might be based. 

Like conventional indexes, the VIX Index calculation employs rules for selecting component options and a formula to calculate index values. Unlike other market products, VIX cannot be bought or sold directly. Instead, VIX is traded and exchanged via derivative contract, derived ETFs, and ETNs which most commonly track VIX futures indexes.

In addition to VIX, CBOE uses the same methodology to compute the following related products:

 CBOE ShortTerm Volatility Index (VIX9DSM), which reflects 9-day expected volatility of the S&P 500 Index, 
 CBOE S&P 500® 3-Month Volatility Index (VIX3MSM), 
 CBOE S&P 500® 6-Month Volatility Index (VIX6MSM) 
 CBOE S&P 500 1-Year Volatility Index (VIX1YSM). 

CBOE also calculates the Nasdaq-100® Volatility Index (VXNSM), CBOE DJIA® Volatility Index (VXDSM) and the CBOE Russell 2000® Volatility Index (RVXSM). There is even a VIX on VIX (VVIX) which is a volatility of volatility measure in that it represents the expected volatility of the 30-day forward price of the CBOE Volatility Index (the VIX®).

Specifications

The concept of computing implied volatility or an implied volatility index dates back to the publication of the Black and Scholes' 1973 paper, "The Pricing of Options and Corporate Liabilities," published in the Journal of Political Economy, which introduced the seminal Black–Scholes model for valuing options. Just as a bond's implied yield to maturity can be computed by equating a bond's market price to its valuation formula, an option-implied volatility of a financial or physical asset can be computed by equating the asset option's market price to its valuation formula. In the case of VIX, the option prices used are the S&P 500 index option prices.

The VIX takes as inputs the market prices of the call and put options on the S&P 500 index for near-term options with more than 23 days until expiration, next-term options with less than 37 days until expiration, and risk-free U.S. treasury bill interest rates. Options are ignored if their bid prices are zero or where their strike prices are outside the level where two consecutive bid prices are zero. The goal is to estimate the implied volatility of S&P 500 index options at an average expiration of 30 days.

The VIX is the volatility of a variance swap and not that of a volatility swap, volatility being the square root of variance, or standard deviation. A variance swap can be perfectly statically replicated through vanilla puts and calls, whereas a volatility swap requires dynamic hedging. The VIX is the square root of the risk-neutral expectation of the S&P 500 variance over the next 30 calendar days and is quoted as an annualized standard deviation.

The VIX is calculated and disseminated in real-time by the Chicago Board Options Exchange. On March 26, 2004, trading in futures on the VIX began on CBOE Futures Exchange (CFE). 

On February 24, 2006, it became possible to trade options on the VIX. Several exchange-traded funds hold mixtures of VIX futures that attempt to enable stock-like trading in those futures.  The correlation between these ETFs and the actual VIX index is very poor, especially when the VIX is moving.

VIX Formula

The VIX is the 30-day expected volatility of the SP500 index, more precisely the square root of a 30-day expected realized variance of the index. It is calculated as a weighted average of out-of-the-money call and put options on the S&P 500:

History

The following is a timeline of key events in the history of the VIX Index: 
1987 - The Sigma Index was introduced in an academic paper by Brenner and Galai, published in Financial Analysts Journal, July/August 1989. Brenner and Galai wrote, "Our volatility index, to be named Sigma Index, would be updated frequently and used as the underlying asset for futures and options... A volatility index would play the same role as the market index play for options and futures on the index."
1989 - Brenner and Galai's paper is published in Financial Analysts Journal. Brenner and Galai develop their research further in graduate symposia at The Hebrew University of Jerusalem and at the Leonard M. Stern School of Business at New York University.
1992 - The American Stock Exchange announced it is conducting a feasibility study on a volatility index, proposed as the "Sigma Index."
1993 - On January 19, 1993, the Chicago Board Options Exchange held a press conference to announce the launch of real-time reporting of the CBOE Market Volatility Index or VIX. The formula that determines the VIX is tailored to the CBOE S&P 100 Index (OEX) option prices, and was developed by Professor Robert E. Whaley of Duke University (now at Vanderbilt University), whom the CBOE had commissioned. This index, now known as the VXO, is a measure of implied volatility calculated using 30-day S&P 100 index at-the-money options.
1993 - Professors Brenner and Galai develop their 1989 proposal for a series of volatility index in their paper, "Hedging Volatility in Foreign Currencies," published in The Journal of Derivatives in the fall of 1993.
2003 - The CBOE introduces a new methodology for the VIX. Working with Goldman Sachs, the CBOE developed further computational methodologies, and changed the underlying index the CBOE S&P 100 Index (OEX) to the CBOE S&P 500 Index (SPX). The old methodology was renamed the VXO.
2004 - On March 26, 2004, the first-ever trading in futures on the VIX Index began on the CBOE Futures Exchange (CFE). VIX is now proposed on different trading platforms, like XTB.
2006 - VIX options were launched in February of this year.
2008 - On October 24, 2008, the VIX reached an intraday high of 89.53.
2008 - On November 21, 2008, the VIX closed at a record 80.74.
2018 - On February 5, 2018, the VIX closed 37.32 (up 103.99% from previous close).
2020 - On March 9, 2020, the VIX hit 62.12, the highest level since the 2008 financial crisis due to a combination of the 2020 Russia–Saudi Arabia oil price war and the COVID-19 pandemic.
2020 - During the COVID-19 pandemic, on March 12, 2020, the VIX hit and closed at 75.47, exceeding the previous Black Monday value, as a travel ban to the US from Europe was announced by President Trump.
2020 - On March 16, the VIX closed at 82.69, the highest level since its inception in 1990.
2021 - The U.S. Securities and Exchange Commission fined the S&P Dow Jones Indices for halting data on February 5, 2018.

Interpretation

VIX is sometimes criticized as a prediction of future volatility. Instead it is described as a measure of the current price of index options.

Critics claim that, despite a sophisticated formulation, the predictive power of most volatility forecasting models is similar to that of plain-vanilla measures, such as simple past volatility. However, other works have countered that these critiques failed to correctly implement the more complicated models.

Some practitioners and portfolio managers have questioned the depth of our understanding of the fundamental concept of volatility, itself. For example, Daniel Goldstein and Nassim Taleb famously titled one of their research articles, We Don't Quite Know What We are Talking About When We Talk About Volatility. Relatedly, Emanuel Derman has expressed disillusion with empirical models that are unsupported by theory. He argues that, while "theories are attempts to uncover the hidden principles underpinning the world around us... [we should remember that] models are metaphors—analogies that describe one thing relative to another."

Michael Harris, the trader, programmer, price pattern theorist, and author, has argued that VIX just tracks the inverse of price and has no predictive power.

According to some, VIX should have predictive power as long as the prices computed by the Black-Scholes equation are valid assumptions about the volatility predicted for the future lead time (the remaining time to maturity). Robert J. Shiller has argued that it would be circular reasoning to consider VIX to be proof of Black-Scholes, because they both express the same implied volatility, and has found that calculating VIX retrospectively in 1929 did not predict the surpassing volatility of the Great Depression—suggesting that in the case of anomalous conditions, VIX cannot even weakly predict future severe events.

An academic study from the University of Texas at Austin and Ohio State University examined potential methods of VIX manipulation. On February 12, 2018, a letter was sent to the Commodity Futures Trading Commission and Securities and Exchange Commission by a law firm representing an anonymous whistleblower alleging manipulation of the VIX.

Volatility of volatility

In 2012, the CBOE introduced the "VVIX index" (also referred to as "vol of vol"), a measure of the VIX's expected volatility.  VVIX is calculated using the same methodology as VIX, except the inputs are market prices for VIX options instead of stock market options.

The VIX can be thought of as the velocity of investor fear.  The VVIX can be thought of as the acceleration of investor fear.

See also

 Economic Policy Uncertainty Index
 Greed and fear
 Hindenburg Omen
 IVX
 Market trend
 Probability of default
 S&P/ASX 200 VIX
 SKEW
 Volfefe index

References

Further reading

Black, Fischer and Myron Scholes. "The Pricing of Options and Corporate Liabilities." Journal of Political Economy (May/June 1973), pp. 637–659.
 

"Amex Explores Volatility Options," International Financing Review, August 8, 1992.
Black, Keith H. "Improving Hedge Fund Risk Exposures by Hedging Equity Market Volatility, or How the VIX Ate My Kurtosis." The Journal of Trading. (Spring 2006).
Connors, Larry. "A Volatile Idea." Futures (July 1999): p. 36—37.
Connors, Larry. "Timing Your S&P Trades with the VIX." Futures (June 2002): pp. 46–47.
Copeland, Maggie. "Market Timing: Style and Size Rotation Using the VIX." Financial Analysts Journal, (Mar/Apr 1999); pp. 73–82.
Daigler, Robert T., and Laura Rossi. "A Portfolio of Stocks and Volatility." The Journal of Investing. (Summer 2006).
Fleming, Jeff, Barbara Ostdiek, and Robert E. Whaley, "Predicting Stock Market Volatility: A New Measure," The Journal of Futures Markets 15 (May 1995), pp. 265–302.
Hulbert, Mark, "The Misuse of the Stock Market's Fear Index," Barron's, October 7, 2011.
Mele, Antonio and Yoshiki Obayashi. "The Price of Fixed Income Market Volatility." Springer Verlag: Springer Finance Series, New York (2015).
Moran, Matthew T., "Review of the VIX Index and VIX Futures.," Journal of Indexes, (October/November 2004). pp. 16–19.
Moran, Matthew T. and Srikant Dash. "VIX Futures and Options: Pricing and Using Volatility Products to Manage Downside Risk and Improve Efficiency in Equity Portfolios." The Journal of Trading. (Summer 2007).
Szado, Ed. "VIX Futures and Options—A Case Study of Portfolio Diversification During the 2008 Financial Crisis." (June 2009).
Tan, Kopin. "The ABCs of VIX." Barron's (Mar 15, 2004): p. MW16.
Tracy, Tennille. "Trading Soars on Financials As Volatility Index Hits Record." Wall Street Journal. (Sept. 30, 2008) pg. C6.
Whaley, Robert E., "Derivatives on Market Volatility: Hedging Tools Long Overdue," The Journal of Derivatives 1 (Fall 1993), pp. 71–84.
Whaley, Robert E., "The Investor Fear Gauge," The Journal of Portfolio Management 26 (Spring 2000), pp. 12–17.
Whaley, Robert E., "Understanding the VIX." The Journal of Portfolio Management 35 (Spring 2009), pp. 98–105.

External links
 Official website at CBOE

American stock market indices
Derivatives (finance)
Mathematical finance
Technical analysis